The 2019 OFC Champions League qualifying stage was played from 26 January to 1 February 2019. A total of four teams competed in the qualifying stage to decide two of the 16 places in the group stage of the 2019 OFC Champions League.

Draw
The draw for the qualifying stage was held on 13 November 2018 at the OFC Headquarters in Auckland, New Zealand. The champions of the host association (Cook Islands) were allocated to Position 1, and the champions of the three remaining developing associations were drawn to determine the fixtures (first team drawn allocated to Position 2, second team drawn allocated to Position 3, third team drawn allocated to Position 4).

Format
The four teams in the qualifying stage played each other on a round-robin basis at a centralised venue. The winners and runners-up advanced to the group stage to join the 14 direct entrants.
According to the group stage draw:
The qualifying stage winners advanced to Group D.
The qualifying stage runners-up advanced to Group C.

Schedule
Matches were played between 26 January – 1 February 2019 in the Cook Islands.
The schedule of each matchday was as follows.

Matches
All times were local, CKT (UTC−10).

Notes

References

External links
OFC Champions League 2019, oceaniafootball.com

1
January 2019 sports events in Oceania
February 2019 sports events in Oceania
International association football competitions hosted by the Cook Islands